Cymindis altaica is a species of ground beetle in the subfamily Harpalinae. It was described by Gebler in 1833.

References

altaica
Beetles described in 1833